The 1996–97 FA Premier League (known as the FA Carling Premiership for sponsorship reasons) was the fifth season of the FA Premier League since its formation in 1992. The majority of the season was contested by the reigning champions, Manchester United, along with Newcastle United, Arsenal and Liverpool. The title was eventually won by Manchester United, after Liverpool and Newcastle's failure to win in their penultimate games of the season; at 75 points it is the lowest points total for a Premier League champion and lowest since the 3-1-0 points system was introduced in the 1981–82 season.

Middlesbrough – despite spending millions of pounds on high-profile foreign players like Emerson, Fabrizio Ravanelli (who scored 31 goals in all competitions), Branco and Gianluca Festa – were relegated on the final day of the season and were on the losing side in both the FA Cup and League Cup finals. Middlesbrough finished in 19th place, but they would have been placed outside the relegation zone without a three-point deduction imposed for unilaterally postponing a December 1996 fixture at Blackburn Rovers, with the Middlesbrough board blaming the decision on the absence of 23 players ill or injured. The club consulted the Premier League prior to calling off the fixture and were told to do 'what they thought best'. To protect the integrity of the game, and avoid fielding a team of untried teenagers including three goalkeepers, Middlesbrough called off the match. The Premier League subsequently absolved themselves of all responsibility and deducted the three points. This sanction meant Coventry City, who had been in the top division since 1967, finished in 17th place and avoided relegation. The decision was controversial and later resurfaced in 2006–07 when West Ham escaped a points deduction and subsequently avoided relegation.

Another relegation place went to Nottingham Forest, who sacked manager Frank Clark in December. Stuart Pearce took over as temporary player-manager, spending three months in charge and winning the January 1997 Manager of the Month award. In March, Pearce quit as manager to be replaced by Dave Bassett, formerly of Crystal Palace. Also relegated, due to a 1–0 defeat to Wimbledon in their last game of the season, were Sunderland, who were leaving Roker Park after 99 years and relocating to the 42,000-seat Stadium of Light on the banks of the River Wear for the start of the 1997–98 season in Division One.

Teams
Twenty teams competed in the league – the top seventeen teams from the previous season and the three teams promoted from the First Division. The promoted teams were Sunderland, Derby County (both teams returning to the top flight after a five-year absence) and Leicester City (immediately returning to the top flight after a season's absence). This was also both Sunderland and Derby County's first season in the Premier League. They replaced Manchester City, Queens Park Rangers and Bolton Wanderers, ending their top flight spells of seven, thirteen and one year respectively.

Stadiums and locations

Personnel and kits

(as of 11 May 1997)

Managerial changes

League table

Results

Season statistics

Scoring

Top scorers

Hat-tricks 

Note: 4 Player scored 4 goals; L Player finished on the losing side; (H) – Home; (A) – Away

Top assists

Awards

Monthly awards

Annual awards

See also
 1996–97 in English football

Notes

References

External links
1996–97 Premier League Season at RSSSF

 
Premier League seasons
Eng
1996–97 in English football leagues